Rovers Football Club are a professional football club based in Guam. Rovers FC participates in Division 1 of the Guam Men's Soccer League the top tier island-wide football competition. Rovers FC also includes a Division 2 and Masters (40+) squad as well as a women's squad (Lady Rovers) and an expanding youth program.

History 
Rovers FC was founded in 2008 through the common interest and shared vision of four passionate amateur Masters-level footballers who committed to embarking on the development of a premier football club to challenge the island's historically dominant clubs. The masters (40+) team provided the foundation of the club and immediately paid dividends with success in 2009–10 and numerous fruitful results in travels to Saipan in the Northern Mariana Islands and Hong Kong. Plans for the club's growth were cultivated during the many trips abroad for friendlies.  In 2010, a Rovers FC Division 2 team was established in the Guam Football Association Men's League. After finishing 1st, 2nd, and 1st, a decision was made in 2013 to finally enter the top level on the island through the development of a Division 1 squad.

This bottom up approach was successful and the Rovers FC D1 team secured a “double” by finishing as champions in their first year in the BGMSL and winning the Guam Football Association Cup in 2014.  The Rovers  FC D1 squad repeated as Division 1 champions again in 2015 securing the privilege to participate in regional AFC competitions such as the AFC President's Cup (AFC CL for “emerging nations”) and now in the AFC Cup Qualifying Playoffs which has replaced the AFC President's Cup (2016 AFC Cup). The club's rise mirrored national team success which has seen the Guam National Team move from FIFA ranking 201 to 146 over the previous five years.

International competitions

On many occasions the Rovers FC has travelled to Hong Kong and Saipan with future plans to travel to the Philippines, Japan, Korea, Taiwan and other destinations. The Rovers FC also has plans to continue to springboard to new competitions in regional locations by becoming the very first club from Guam to take part in an official AFC Tournament, the AFC Cup Qualifying Play-offs. In the 2016 AFC Cup Qualifying Play-offs, Rovers FC competed against Dordoi Bishkek, the champions of Kyrgyzstan's premier league, and Benfica de Macau, the champions of Macau's premier league.

The Rovers FC has a history of hosting various tournaments whereby clubs from foreign countries have traveled to Guam to compete. Club teams mostly from Japan and Saipan visit Guam to participate in these special weekend tournaments. There are plans on the horizon for these types of tournaments to become more frequent with visiting teams from Korea, China, Hong Kong, Taiwan and the Philippines as well as the teams from Japan and Saipan. Rovers FC have already acquired the reputation as an outstanding hosting club and will continue to elevate these events to bolster that reputation.

Achievements
Guam Soccer League 
 2013–14, 2014–15, 2015–16, 2016–17, 2017–18, 2018–19

Guam FA Cup 
 2014, 2016

Squad

Club officials (Board)
Richard Hawes
Joel Sablan
Pedro Walls
Saied Safa
Craig Wade

Continental history

References

External links 

 Results

Football clubs in Guam
2008 establishments in Guam
Association football clubs established in 2008